The Central Arava Regional Council is a Regional Council in the South District of Israel.

It encompasses eight settlements near the eastern border of Israel, south of the Dead Sea.  All settlements are located near Route 90, which is the longest north–south road in Israel.

Settlements in the council
The Central Arava Regional Council comprises five moshavim and three community settlements:

Moshavim
 Ein Yahav (עין יהב)
 Hatzeva (חצבה)
 Idan (עידן)
 Paran (פארן)
 Tzofar (צופר)

Community settlements
Ir Ovot (עיר אובות)
 Sapir (ספיר)
 Tzukim (צוקים)

External links
 Central Arava regional councîl (www.arava.co.il)

 
Regional councils in Israel
1977 establishments in Israel